The 1976 New England Patriots season was the franchise's 7th season in the National Football League and 17th overall.

After a nine-year stretch in which they posted just one non-losing season amid eight losing years, the Patriots turned around their fortunes, going 11–3. It marked their first winning season as an NFL team (their last winning season came in 1966, when the team was still in the AFL). The team had gone just 3–11 the previous season, and was considered a "Cinderella team" in 1976. Coach Chuck Fairbanks was named NFL Coach of the Year, and cornerback Mike Haynes was named NFL Rookie of the Year.

The 1976 Patriots rushed for a total of 2,957 yards (averaging five yards per carry) and scored 376 points, both second-best in the league. The 2,957 yards rushing were the fifth-highest total in NFL history at the time. The team's 5.0 yards per carry was the best in the NFL and remains higher than all Super Bowl champions except the 1973 Miami Dolphins whose own run game was 5.0 yards per carry. The Patriots also led the league in takeaways at 50; the Patriots finished third in the league in turnover differential at plus-14.

The Patriots made only their second playoff appearance in their history and first since 1963, but lost to the eventual Super Bowl champion Oakland Raiders in the first round of the playoffs. Earlier in the season, the Patriots handed the Raiders their only loss of the season with a final score of 48–17, but a controversial roughing the passer penalty on Ray Hamilton on a Raiders drive late in the playoff game dimmed the Patriots' hopes of defeating the Raiders again.

Despite the playoff loss, the team has been considered one of the most talented in Patriots history; in 2004, Patriots head coach Bill Belichick, who was an assistant coach for the Detroit Lions in 1976, called this Patriots team "loaded", a "who's who team."

After the season, offensive line coach Red Miller was hired as head coach of the Denver Broncos. In his first season, he led them to the AFC's best record (12–2), their first-ever postseason appearance, and the Super Bowl.

Staff

Schedule 

Note: Intra-division opponents are in bold text.

Post-season schedule

Game Summaries 
 August 30 Monday Night Football (preseason) at Cleveland Browns:
The Patriots fell 30-27 in a Monday Night preseason game; rookie cornerback Michael Haynes ran back a punt but began celebrating at the five-yard line and was hit and fumbled; Darryl Stingley grabbed the fumble and scored. Entering the season the Patriots had never scored on a punt return in any game. The loss was the third of the six-game preseason.

 September 12 vs. Baltimore Colts:
Four Steve Grogan interceptions and a fumble doomed the Patriots as the “Shake & Bake” Colts ran roughshod at Schaefer Stadium 27–13, this despite the sacking of Colts quarterback Bert Jones for 40 yards and 179 rushing yards by the Patriots.

 September 19 vs. Miami Dolphins:
The Pats rebounded with 278 rushing yards and four touchdowns (two rushing scores by Andy Johnson, a Grogan rushing score, and a four-yard toss to Russ Francis) in a 30–14 rout of Miami. Bob Griese had one touchdown throw and three interceptions.

 September 26 at Pittsburgh Steelers:
Forcing six Steeler fumbles in heavy rain, the Patriots wiped out a 20–9 third-quarter gap as Steve Grogan threw to Russ Francis and Darryl Stingley and ran in a touchdown for 21 second-half points. Don Calhoun's fumble in the final four minutes led to a Bradshaw touchdown, and after forcing another punt with 1:29 to go Bradshaw nearly fumbled away the ball but converted two first downs requiring 25 or more yards. With three seconds to go Roy Gerela missed a field goal and the Patriots had an upset 30–27 win.

 October 3 vs. Oakland Raiders

The Raiders suffered their only loss of the season in a 48–17 slaughter by the Patriots. Ken Stabler had a touchdown throw to Fred Biletnikoff but was sacked four times while Steve Grogan ran wild with three touchdown throws (to Darryl Stingley and Marlin Briscoe) and two rushing scores; Andy Johnson and Jess Phillips rushed in additional touchdowns. During the third quarter a Raiders touchdown was twice wiped out on penalties and the drive ended in a Stabler sack on third-and-26.

 October 10 at Detroit Lions:
The Patriots never got on track as Grogan threw five picks and the Lions, led by running back Horace King and quarterback Greg Landry, stampeded the Patriots 30–10. One of the members of the Lions staff in this game was assistant special teams coach Bill Belichick, who introduced a two tight-end set on Detroit's offense that was rare for the NFL at the time.

 October 18 Monday Night Football vs. NY Jets:
The Patriots despite ten penalties exploded to 330 rushing yards (103 of them with a touchdown by Steve Grogan; Grogan said years later the score came after botching what was supposed to be a hand off to Sam Cunningham) as they annihilated the Jets 41-7. Alex Karras (whose grandnephew Ted would be drafted by the Patriots in 2016) was working the ABC Sports booth and read aloud Jets coach Lou Holtz's fight song for the team, a reworked version of the US Army's original march The Caissons Go Rolling Along.

 October 24 @ Buffalo Bills:
The Patriots posted their first win over the Bills since 1971 as the two teams combined for nine turnovers, 125 yards in penalties, and 586 yards of offense in the 26-22 New England win. Sam Cunningham and O. J. Simpson combined for 229 rushing yards.

 Halloween @ Miami Dolphins:
Despite 130 rushing yards from five Patriots backs New England fell at Miami 10-3; all scoring took place in the second quarter as Jim Mandich accounted for the game's only touchdown. The Patriots were also penalized eleven times for 80 yards.

 November 7 vs. Buffalo Bills:
Mike Haynes became the first Patriot to ever return a punt for a touchdown as he fielded a second-quarter punt at his 11 and stormed to the Buffalo endzone. The Patriots won 20–10 as Sam Cunningham rushed for 141 yards and a score while Joe Ferguson of the Bills threw four picks; the Bills also fumbled four times while the Patriots coughed up five turnovers (three fumbles and two INTs). O. J. Simpson threw a punch at Mel Lunsford and both players were ejected after the ensuing fight.

 November 14 at Baltimore Colts:
Battling for the division lead, the Colts and Patriots combined for 35 first-half points. In the first quarter Roger Carr caught a 22-yard pass from Bert Jones for the Colts while Al Chandler caught a two-yarder from Steve Grogan. Grogan ran in two second-quarter touchdowns and Don McCauley ran in a score for a 21–14 Patriots lead at the half. The two defenses then shut each other out, as Jones was picked off twice by Mike Haynes and sacked five times in total; Lydell Mitchell was limited to 52 rushing yards and the Patriots held on for the 21–14 win.

 November 21 at New York Jets:
The Jets hosted the Patriots at Shea Stadium and raced to a 10–0 lead in the first quarter behind a Pat Leahy field goal and a Greg Buttle fumble-return score, but the Patriots behind Steve Grogan throws to Andy Johnson and Darryl Stingley took a 14–10 lead entering the second quarter. From there the game collapsed for the 3–7 Jets as Joe Namath threw six interceptions; Mike Haynes grabbed three and Tim Fox had one, while Prentice McCray ran in two (totalling 118 yards) for touchdowns. With Sam Cunningham injured Don Calhoun became the workhorse back for New England, rushing for 109 yards. Namath was benched in the fourth quarter and Richard Todd took over; he threw a touchdown to Clark Gaines but was later picked off by Bob Howard. Grogan threw for just 83 yards and three scores as the Patriots routed the Jets 38–24.

 November 28 vs. Denver Broncos:
The Patriots amassed their highest rushing yardage of the year as Don Calhoun (177 yards), Andy Johnson, and Ike Forte ground up 332 yards on the ground. Mike Haynes also returned a punt 62 yards for a touchdown as the Patriots sacked Denver's quarterbacks nine times, led 31–0 at the half, and cruised to a 38–14 final.

 December 5 vs. New Orleans Saints:
With Archie Manning out for the year the Saints wound up using two quarterbacks (including ex-Bear Bobby Douglass) but managed only 236 total yards vs. 220 rushing yards from the Patriots led by Don Calhoun's 113 yards. In winning 27-6 Steve Grogan completed only nine of 23 passes but two of them were touchdowns, one to Al Chandler, subbing for injured Russ Francis. The win was the 100th career victory in the franchise's history.

 December 12 @ Tampa Bay Buccaneers:
Steve Grogan had his worst passing day of the season with just 40 yards in the air and a pick amid just four completions in 14 attempts. Six Patriots backs led by Andy Johnson rushed for 260 yards and three touchdowns while Sam Hunt picked off Steve Spurrier and ran back 68-yard touchdown. The game ended Tampa's winless first ever season.

 December 18 at Oakland Raiders:
The 1976 AFC Divisional Playoffs. This would become the infamous "Ben Dreith Game" as officiating became a major controversy with numerous questionable penalties. Bill Lenkaitis had not been flagged for holding all season yet was flagged three times in this game. No penalty was called when George Atkinson of the Raiders hammered Russ Francis in the facemask and broke his nose; Steve Zabel popped Francis' nose back into place. There was also controversy over a Sam Cunningham run in the final five minutes of the fourth quarter where he went out of bounds; John Hannah claimed the sideline official moved the first down marker just before Cunningham went out of bounds, denying him a first down. On the play following this Cunningham run, on 3rd and 1 at the Raiders 28-yard line, Steve Grogan changed the snap count to draw the Raiders offsides, but the Raiders were barking out dummy snap counts themselves and Hannah, Leon Gray, and Pete Brock all jumped offsides ("I should have known better", Grogan said afterward). On the next play (3rd and 6) Grogan threw to Russ Francis but Francis could not raise his arms because of holding by the Raiders Phil Villapiano, holding so blatant that according to Francis, "(he left) bruise marks on my arm....when I saw Phil at the Pro Bowl that year, he came right out and told me he had done it." The Patriots missed the ensuing field goal attempt and the Raiders took possession. In the final minute of the fourth quarter Raymond Hamilton of the Patriots was flagged for roughing the passer against Ken Stabler of the Raiders on a 3rd-and-18 play, even though replays showed no roughing; Dreith said the call was made because Hamilton had hit Stabler's helmet, but replays showed Stabler ducking away from Hamilton. Despite Patriot protests (Hamilton was flagged for unsportsmanlike conduct for his protests) the call stood. The Patriots stopped the Raiders on 3rd and 1 near the goal line but another personal foul penalty (this one on Prentice McCray) extended the Raiders drive, and on second and goal at the Patriot 1-yard line Stabler ran in the game-winning touchdown with ten seconds left in a 24–21 Raiders win. Patriot protests over Dreith's call were such that Dreith was not assigned to work any games involving the Patriots until 1987.

Standings

Roster

References 

New England Patriots
New England Patriots seasons
New England Patriots
Sports competitions in Foxborough, Massachusetts